Essam Abdallah Ibrahim Mubaideen (born 15 June 1986) is a Jordanian footballer who plays for Al-Salt SC.

International career
Essam's first match with the Jordan national senior team was against Belarus in an international friendly held on 21 March 2013 in Amman, which resulted in a 1-0 victory for Jordan.

International goals

References

External links 
 
 Essam Al-Mbaydin at Goal.com

1986 births
Living people
Jordanian footballers
Jordan international footballers
Association football forwards
Al-Faisaly SC players
Al-Jazeera (Jordan) players
Shabab Al-Ordon Club players
Footballers at the 2006 Asian Games
Asian Games competitors for Jordan